The Province of Hesse-Nassau was a province of the Kingdom of Prussia from 1868 to 1918, then a province of the Free State of Prussia until 1944.

Hesse-Nassau was created as a consequence of the Austro-Prussian War of 1866 by combining the previously independent Hesse-Kassel (or Hesse-Cassel), the Duchy of Nassau, the Free City of Frankfurt, areas gained from the Kingdom of Bavaria, and areas gained from the Grand Duchy of Hesse (including part of the former Landgraviate of Hesse-Homburg from Hesse-Darmstadt). These regions were combined to form the province Hesse-Nassau in 1868 with its capital in Kassel and redivided into two administrative regions: Kassel and Wiesbaden. The largest part of the province surrounded the province of Upper Hesse in the Grand Duchy of Hesse (People's State of Hesse from 1918).

On 1 April 1929, the Free State of Waldeck became a part of Hesse-Nassau after a popular vote, becoming part of the Kassel administrative region.

In 1935, the Nazi government de facto abolished all states, so the provinces held little meaning. Nevertheless, effective 1 July 1944, Hesse-Nassau was split into the provinces of Kurhessen (capital in Kassel) and Nassau (capital in Wiesbaden). In 1945, after the end of World War II, these two provinces were re-merged and combined with most of the neighbouring People's State of Hesse to form Greater Hesse, which became the modern state of Hesse in 1946. Parts of Nassau were also moved into the Rhineland-Palatinate.

Oberpräsidents
The Oberpräsident (or "High Commissioner") was the chief administrator of a Prussian province, appointed by the King on the advice of the Prussian Minister for the Interior. The Oberpräsident administered the province with the assistance of a Prussian government-appointed provincial council.

Insignia
The flag of Hesse-Nassau is identical to that of the Netherlands. The Dutch royal house originates from the Duchy of Nassau.

The coat of arms is split into three parts, each part showing the coats of arms for the three entities that formed Hesse-Nassau:
 a crowned, silver/red-striped lion on a blue background (Electorate of Hesse)
 a crowned, golden lion on a blue field strewn with billets (Duchy of Nassau)
 a silver eagle with golden talons on a red background (Free City of Frankfurt)

 
Former states and territories of Rhineland-Palatinate
Former states and territories of Hesse
1868 establishments in Prussia
1944 disestablishments in Germany